The Sterling Bank of Canada was a Canadian bank that was incorporated in 1905 in Toronto, Ontario. The bank was led by Gabriel T. Somers (as President) and George B. Woods, the former would later become the head of the Toronto Board of Trade. It merged with the Standard Bank of Canada in 1924 which, in turn, merged with the Canadian Bank of Commerce in 1928.

See also 
 List of Canadian banks

References 

 CIBC - Mergers and Amalgamations, The Canadian Bank of Commerce

Defunct banks of Canada
Banks established in 1905
Canadian companies established in 1905